William McLaughlin (22 June 1878 – 20 July 1946) was a Scottish footballer who played as an inside right for most of his career, latterly as a centre half. He played for Hamilton Academical over two spells, and was captain of the Accies team in the 1911 Scottish Cup Final (a defeat to Celtic after a replay). He also featured in the English Football League for Everton (though he was not selected for the 1906 FA Cup Final, having fallen behind others in the queue for selection including fellow Scot Hugh Bolton), and Preston North End, in the Southern League for Plymouth Argyle and in the Irish League for Shelbourne. He was also a school teacher by profession.

References

1878 births
1946 deaths
Sportspeople from Cambuslang
Scottish people of Irish descent
Association football defenders
Association football inside forwards
Scottish footballers
Scottish schoolteachers
Cambuslang Hibernian F.C. players
Hamilton Academical F.C. players
Everton F.C. players
Plymouth Argyle F.C. players
Preston North End F.C. players
Shelbourne F.C. players
Scottish Football League players
English Football League players
Southern Football League players
NIFL Premiership players
Scottish Junior Football Association players
Footballers from South Lanarkshire